George Leake (1856–1902) was Premier of Western Australia and son of George Walpole Leake.

George Leake may also refer to:

George Leake (merchant) (1786–1849), director of the Bank of Western Australia and chairman of the Perth Town Trust
George Walpole Leake (1825–1895), barrister and magistrate and nephew of George Leake (1786–1849)

See also
Leake family tree